Nicholas Anthony Vespi (born October 10, 1995) is an American professional baseball pitcher for the Baltimore Orioles of Major League Baseball (MLB). He made his MLB debut in 2022.

Career
Vespi played college baseball at Palm Beach State College. He was drafted by the Baltimore Orioles in the 18th round of the 2015 MLB draft.

Vespi was called up to the majors for the first time on May 17, 2022.

Vespi made his Major League debut on May 20, 2022, pitching two innings for the Orioles in an extra innings game against the Tampa Bay Rays, striking out three, giving up no runs, and being credited with his first career MLB win. He made 25 total appearances for the Orioles in 2022, logging a 5-0 record 4.10 ERA with 28 strikeouts across 26.1 innings pitched. On January 5, 2023, Vespi underwent hernia surgery.

International career
On December 16, 2022, Vespi announced that he had been selected to represent Italy in the 2023 World Baseball Classic.

References

External links

1995 births
Living people
Baseball players from Miami
Major League Baseball pitchers
Baltimore Orioles players
Palm Beach State Panthers baseball players
Gulf Coast Orioles players
Aberdeen IronBirds players
Delmarva Shorebirds players
Bowie Baysox players
Norfolk Tides players
Mesa Solar Sox players